KRMS-FM (93.5 MHz, "93.5 Rocks") is a radio station licensed to serve Osage Beach, Missouri, United States. The station, originally established in April 1964, is currently owned and operated by Viper Communications, Inc.

Programming
KRMS-FM broadcasts a classic rock format to the Lake of the Ozarks region. In addition to its usual music programming, KRMS-FM broadcasts the high school football games of the Camdenton Lakers and the National Football League games of the Kansas City Chiefs.

History
KRMS-FM was established in April 1964 as an FM sister station to KRMS (1150 AM). Both stations were owned by Central Missouri Broadcasting Company under the co-ownership of James L. Risner and Ella Mae Risner. In October 1979, the Risners agreed to transfer the broadcast license and the station's assets to Lakcom, a limited partnership with Alfred C. Sikes as General Partner. This deal was approved by the Federal Communications Commission (FCC) on January 10, 1980, and consummated on January 16, 1980. The new owners had the FCC change the station's call sign to KYLC on July 4, 1980.

Lakcom L.P. reached an agreement to sell KRMS to a new company called KRMS-KYLC, Inc., in April 1986. The deal was approved by the FCC on May 30, 1986, and the transaction was formally consummated on June 11, 1986. Among the company's investors was United States Senator John C. Danforth. In April 1990, the company, now wholly owned by John B. and Fredna B. Mahaffey, transferred the KRMS broadcast license directly to the Mahaffeys as individuals. They would soon fold the station into Mahaffey Enterprises, Inc.

In September 1997, license holder Mahaffey Enterprises, Inc. reached an agreement to sell KRMS to Viper Communications, Inc. The deal gained FCC approval on October 30, 1997, and the transaction was consummated on November 13, 1997. On January 9, 1998, the new owners (Viper Communications) had the FCC restore its previous KRMS-FM call sign. This format eventually evolved into a Modern and Classic Rock mix, eventually changing from Mike FM to the present 93.5 ROCKS.

On December 20, 2021, Viper once again restored 93.5's original call letters KRMS-FM, releasing the KMYK call letters that were in place since 2006.

HD Radio
In February 2018, KRMS-FM launched a classic country format on its HD2 subchannel, branded as "Classic Country 104.9" (simulcast on translator K285ER Osage Beach).

KRMS-FM also airs a simulcast of news/talk-formatted KRMS 1150 AM Osage Beach on its HD3 subchannel and airs an adult standards format on its HD4 subchannel, branded as "98.7 The Cove".

References

External links
KRMS-FM official website

RMS-FM
Classic rock radio stations in the United States
Radio stations established in 1964
1964 establishments in Missouri
Camden County, Missouri